The King of Rome was a successful racing pigeon, winning a  race from Rome, Italy, to England, in 1913. Bred and trained in England, it was owned by Charlie Hudson of Derby. It set a new long-distance record for a racing pigeon of England. 

The King of Rome is the subject of a 1988 song and a 2010 children's book, both by Dave Sudbury. The best-known of the several recordings of the song is by June Tabor. In 2013 a radio play by Anthony Atkin and Allison Glossop was broadcast to commemorate the 100th anniversary of the pigeon's record-breaking flight.

The bird 
The King of Rome was a racing pigeon that in 1913 won a  race from Rome, Italy to England. The bird, a blue cock, ring number NU1907DY168, was owned, bred and trained by Charlie Hudson (born early 1870s, died 13 March 1958, aged 84), of 56 Brook Street, Derby (now demolished). He reportedly started pigeon racing in 1904. 

At the time of the race, he was president and treasurer of Derby Town Flying Club. He also wrote on pigeon-racing matters for the Derby Evening Telegraph. On the bird's death, Hudson presented its body to Derby Museum and Art Gallery, where its taxidermied skin is preserved (accession number DBYMU.1946/48). As of 2012, it is on display there. The preserved pigeon has previously been exhibited on loan elsewhere, including Walsall Museum and Wollaton Hall in Nottingham.

The race report 

The 2 August 1913 edition of The Racing Pigeon reported:

Representation in other media 

Dave Sudbury (born Derby, 1943) wrote a song in the 1980s about the King of Rome and its owner, Charlie Hudson. It tells how:

indicating the dangers related to the pigeons' races. 

The song was most notably recorded by June Tabor in 1988. She had heard Sudbury perform the song at the Northern Arts Council's 'Songsearch' contest in the late 1980s, where she was a judge. Hudson came in fourth.  Brian McNeill, another finalist at the event, has said: "'The King of Rome' was head and shoulders above every other song sung on the night, and should have won."

Tabor then recorded it for her 1988 album Aqaba. McNeill also has performed the song. He made a live recording included on his 2000 album with Iain MacKintosh, Live and Kicking.

American folksinger Vance Gilbert recorded the song for his 1994 album Edgewise, and Canadian folk musician Garnet Rogers recorded it for his album Small Victories (1990), and again on his live album Summer Lightning (2004). The band Half Man Half Biscuit also recorded a version of the song for a BBC radio session, though it remains unreleased. 

At the BBC Radio 2 Folk Awards in 2012, The Unthanks performed the song,  with accompaniment from the Brighouse and Rastrick Brass Band. It appears on the 2012 album The Unthanks with Brighouse and Rastrick Brass Band.

Sudbury's song was also published as a 32-page children's book (2010), with illustrations by Hans Saefkow.

Anthony Atkin and Allison Glossop wrote a radio drama, The King of Rome (2013), to commemorate the 100th anniversary of the bird's win. The production starred Wayne Russell as Charlie Hudson, and a recording is available online.

Tributes 

On 29 October 2022 a plaque was unveiled inside the Maypole Inn, Brook Street, Derby, in tribute to Charles Hudson, The King of Rome and Dave Sudbury, after a campaign initiated by historian and former teacher Kalwinder Singh Dhindsa.

See also
 List of individual birds

References

External links
 Natural History treasure – The King of Rome
 The King of Rome
 Interview: Dave Sudbury – "The King of Rome", Folk Radio

Media 

, broadcast live at 2012 BBC Radio 2 Folk Awards
 Anthony Atkin and Allison Glossop – The King of Rome – Radio Drama

Collections of Derby Museum and Art Gallery
Pigeon racing
English folk songs
Individual domesticated pigeons
1913 in Europe
Individual animals in sport
Individual animals in England